Kosmos 434 (meaning Cosmos 434) was the final uncrewed test flight of the Soviet LK Lander. It performed the longest burn of the four uncrewed LK Lander tests, validating the backup rocket engine of the LK's Blok E propulsion system. It finished in a 186 km by 11,804 km orbit. This test qualified the lander as flightworthy.

The LK was the only element of the Soviet human lunar programs that reached this status. In 1980-81 there were fears that it might carry nuclear fuel. When it reentered over Australia on August 22, 1981 the Soviet Foreign Ministry in Australia admitted that Kosmos 434 was an “experiment unit of a lunar cabin,” or lunar lander.

See also

 1971 in spaceflight

References

External links 
 Mir Hardware Heritage
 Mir Hardware Heritage - NASA report (PDF format)
 Mir Hardware Heritage (wikisource)

Kosmos 0434
Soviet lunar program
1971 in the Soviet Union
Australia–Soviet Union relations
Spacecraft launched in 1971